Myung-hwa, also spelled Myong-hwa in North Korea, is a Korean feminine given name. Its meaning differs based on the hanja used to write each syllable of the name.

Hanja
There are 19 hanja with the reading "myung" and 15 hanja with the reading "hwa" on the South Korean government's official list of hanja which may be registered for use in given names. Hanja with which this name may be written include:
, meaning "bright flower". The same hanja can also be read as various Japanese given names, including Sayaka and Asuka.

People
People with this name include:
Myung-wha Chung (born 1944), South Korean cellist
Kim Myong-hwa (born 1967, North Korean sport shooter, competed in the women's skeet event at the 2000 Summer Olympics
Lee Myung-hwa (born 1973), South Korean football forward
Jon Myong-hwa (born 1993), North Korean football midfielder, competed at the 2012 Summer Olympics
An Myong-hwa, North Korean gymnast, competed in Gymnastics at the 1992 Summer Olympics – Women's artistic team all-around
Choe Myong-hwa, North Korean diver, competed in Diving at the 2000 Summer Olympics – Women's 10 metre platform

See also
List of Korean given names

References

Korean feminine given names